The 1994 Atlantic Coast Conference baseball tournament was held in Greenville, SC from May 17 through 22. Clemson won the tournament and earned the Atlantic Coast Conference's automatic bid to the 1994 NCAA Division I baseball tournament.

Tournament

Play-in game
The two teams with the worst records in regular season conference play faced each other in a single elimination situation to earn the 8th spot in the conference tournament.

Main bracket

All-Tournament Team

(*)Denotes Unanimous Selection

See also
College World Series
NCAA Division I Baseball Championship

References

2007 ACC Baseball Media Guide 

Tournament
Atlantic Coast Conference baseball tournament
Atlantic Coast Conference baseball tournament
Atlantic Coast Conference baseball tournament
College baseball tournaments in South Carolina
Baseball competitions in Greenville, South Carolina